Canal 1 (pronounced "Canal Uno") is a Colombian state-owned television channel. It is owned by the Government of Colombia and managed by Plural Comunicaciones, S.A.S, a private company. From 1957 to 2017, the channel was administered by private programming companies known as programadoras (television production companies; literally, "programmers"), which bid for time slots with the Colombian state.

History 

Canal 1 started broadcasting on 13 June 1954 as Canal Nacional on channel 8 VHF in Bogotá and was operated by the National Radio of Colombia. In 1963, it was operated by Inravisión (Instituto Nacional de Radio y Televisión), the now-former Colombian public broadcaster. Under Inravisión, the channel's frequency was moved from channel 8 to channel 7 VHF in Bogotá.

Until 1966, when private local channel Teletigre was officially launched, Canal Nacional was the only television channel in Colombia.

In 1972, it became the Primera cadena (First Network) since Teletigre was nationalised as Segunda Cadena. In the 1980s it would become Cadena Uno (Network One), and eventually became Canal Uno at the beginning of 1998.

Since July 1998, when Caracol Televisión and RCN Televisión launched their own private television channels, Channel 1's and Canal A's ratings steadily dropped (see below chart). Adding this to the economic recession of the late 1990s the network was suffering, this situation severely affected the remaining programadoras, which gradually either declared bankruptcy or became production companies for Caracol Televisión and RCN Televisión. Channel 1 was less affected than Canal A, which became Canal Institucional, a State-controlled channel, in November 2003. RTI Colombia, the only programadora remaining on Canal A, was moved to Channel 1 and stood there until 2008.

In February 2014, the channel was rebranded with a new logo, a new graphical package, the removal of infomercials and a 24-hour program schedule.

As of 1 May 2017, a quarter of Channel 1's programming is made by the production companies CM&, NTC Televisión, and RTI Televisión, and a fifth by Hemisphere Media Group, the owner of Puerto Rican station WAPA and several pay-TV channels. The four companies form a joint venture company branded as Plural Comunicaciones.

Historical rating share 

Source:

See also 
 Plural
 CM&
 NTC
 RTI
 Hemisphere
 NotiCentro 1 CM&
 Telenovelas and series of Colombia
 Television in Colombia

References

External links 
 Official website  
 CM& 

Television networks in Colombia
Television channels and stations established in 1954
Television stations in Colombia
Spanish-language television stations